Richard Simon Luddington (born 8 April 1960) is an English former first-class cricketer.

Luddington was born at Kingston upon Thames in April 1960. He later studied at St Edmund Hall at the University of Oxford. While studying at Oxford, he played first-class cricket for Oxford University, making his debut against Northamptonshire at Oxford in 1982, with Luddington making ten appearances for Oxford in that season. Playing as a wicket-keeper, he scored a total of 290 runs in his ten matches at an average of 22.30 and with a high score of 65, while behind the stumps he took five catches and made a single stumping.

References

External links

1960 births
Living people
People from Kingston upon Thames
Alumni of St Edmund Hall, Oxford
English cricketers
Oxford University cricketers